Lora from Morning Till Evening is a 2011 Bulgarian comedy film written and directed by Dimitar Kotzev. The film is based on the 2003 novel of the same name, which Kotzev himself wrote.

Cast
 Milenita as Lora
 Hristo Petkov as The Sleek (Gladkia)
 Iva Gocheva as Silveto
 Antonina Kovacheva as Aunt Sia (as Dr. Antonina Kovacheva)
 Marten Roberto as Mario
 Yulian Kovalevski as The Moustache

References

External links
 
 

2011 films
2011 comedy films
2010s Bulgarian-language films
Films shot in Bulgaria
Bulgarian comedy films
Films set in Bulgaria